Thanin is a given name. Notable people with the name include:

 Thanin Kraivichien (born 1927), Thai judge, politician, and law professor
 Thanin Phanthavong (born 1998), Laotian footballer